The Bishop of Brentwood is the Ordinary of the Roman Catholic Diocese of Brentwood in the Province of Westminster, England.

Overview
The diocese covers the historic county of Essex, an area of  comprising the non-metropolitan county of Essex, the unitary authorities of Southend-on-Sea and Thurrock, and from Greater London, the London Boroughs of Barking & Dagenham, Havering, Newham, Redbridge and Waltham Forest, matching Essex's historic boundaries and the Anglican Diocese of Chelmsford. The see is in the town of Brentwood where the bishop's seat is located at the Cathedral Church of Saint Mary and Saint Helen.

History
The diocese was erected on 20 July 1917 from the Archdiocese of Westminster.  The current bishop is the Right Reverend Alan Williams, the 7th Bishop of Brentwood. He is a member of the Society of Mary and director of the Shrine of Our Lady of Walsingham.

List of the Bishops of the Roman Catholic Diocese of Brentwood, England

References

External links 
Diocese of Brentwood website